In Greek mythology, Thersites (Ancient Greek: Θερσίτης) was a soldier of the Greek army during the Trojan War.

Family 
The Iliad does not mention his father's name, which may suggest that he should be viewed as a commoner rather than an aristocratic hero. However, a quotation from another lost epic in the Trojan cycle, the Aethiopis, names his parents as Agrius of Calydon and Dia, a daughter of King Porthaon.

Mythology 
In some accounts, Thersites, together with his five brothers including Melanippus, overthrew Oeneus from the throne of Calydon and gave the kingdom to Agrius, their father and Oeneus's brother. Later on, they were deposed by Diomedes who reinstated his grandfather Oeneus as king and slew all of Thersites's brothers.

Homer described him in detail in the Iliad, Book II, even though he plays only a minor role in the story. He is said to be bow-legged and lame, to have shoulders that cave inward, and a head which is covered in tufts of hair and comes to a point. This deformity has even given rise to a medical eponym. Vulgar, obscene, and somewhat dull-witted, Thersites disrupts the rallying of the Greek army:

He got up in the assembly and attacked Agamemnon in the words of Achilles [calling him greedy and a coward] ... Odysseus then stood up, delivered a sharp rebuke to Thersites, which he coupled with a threat to strip him naked, and then beat him on the back and shoulders with Agamemnon's sceptre; Thersites doubled over, a warm tear fell from his eye, and a bloody welt formed on his back; he sat down in fear, and in pain gazed helplessly as he wiped away his tear; but the rest of the assembly was distressed and laughed .... There must be a figuration of wickedness as self-evident as Thersites—the ugliest man who came to Troy—who says what everyone else is thinking.

He is not mentioned elsewhere in the Iliad, but it seems that in the lost Aethiopis Achilles eventually killed him "for having torn out the eyes of the Amazon Penthesilea that the hero had just killed in combat."

In his Introduction to The Anger of Achilles, Robert Graves speculates that Homer might have made Thersites a ridiculous figure as a way of dissociating himself from him, because his remarks seem entirely justified. This was a way of letting these remarks, along with Odysseus' brutal act of suppression, remain in the record.

In later literature
Thersites is also mentioned in Plato's Gorgias (525e) as an example of a soul that can be cured in the after-life because of his lack of might; and in The Republic he chooses to be reborn as a nonhuman ape. According to E. R. Dodds, "There he is not so much the typical petty criminal as the typical buffoon; and so Lucian describes him."

The Alexander Romance refers to Thersites when Alexander the Great is claimed to have said that it would be a greater honor to be immortalized in the poetry of Homer, even if only as a minor and detestable character like Thersites, than by the poets of his own day: "I would sooner be a Thersites in Homer than an Agamemnon in your writing". Other recensions replace Agamemnon with Achilles in the comparison.

Along with many of the major figures of the Trojan War, Thersites was a character in Shakespeare's Troilus and Cressida (1602) in which he is described as "a deformed and scurrilous Grecian" and portrayed as a comic servant, in the tradition of the Shakespearean fool, but unusually given to abusive remarks to all he encounters. He begins as Ajax's slave, telling Ajax, "I would thou didst itch from head to foot and I had the scratching of thee; I would make thee the loathsomest scab in Greece." Thersites soon leaves Ajax and puts himself into the service of Achilles (portrayed by Shakespeare as a kind of bohemian figure), who appreciates his bitter, caustic humor. Shakespeare mentions Thersites again in his later play Cymbeline, when Guiderius says, "Thersites' body is as good as Ajax' / When neither are alive."

Laurence Sterne writes of Thersites in the last volume of his Tristram Shandy, chapter 14, declaring him to be the exemplar of abusive satire, as black as the ink it is written with.

In Part Two of Goethe's Faust (1832), Act One, during the Masquerade, Thersites appears briefly and criticizes the goings-on. He says, "When some lofty thing is done / I gird at once my harness on. / Up with what's low, what's high eschew, / Call crooked straight, and straight askew". The Herald, who acts as Master of Revels or Lord of Misrule, strikes Thersites with his mace, at which point he metamorphoses into an egg, from which a bat and an adder are hatched.

As social critic
The role of Thersites as a social critic has been advanced by several philosophers and literary critics, including Georg Wilhelm Friedrich Hegel, Friedrich Nietzsche, Edward Said, Thomas Woods and Kenneth Burke. In the passage below from Language as Symbolic Action, Burke cites Hegel's coinage of the term "Thersitism", and he proceeds to describe a version of it as a process by which an author both privileges protest in a literary work but also disguises or disowns it, so as not to distract from the literary form of the work, which must push on toward other effects than the protest per se:

An example of this stratagem is the role of Thersites in the Iliad. For any Greeks who were likely to resent the stupidity of the Trojan War, the text itself provided a spokesman who voiced their resistance. And he was none other than the abominable Thersites, for whom no "right-minded" member of the Greek audience was likely to feel sympathy. As early as Hegel, however, his standard role was beginning to be questioned. Consider, for instance, these remarks in the introduction to Hegel's Lectures on the Philosophy of History:

Thersites also appears in the writings of Karl Marx, and those of later Marxist literature in Soviet times much in the spirit of Hegel's construal. Heiner Müller casts Thersites in the role of Shepherd who also shears his sheep reflecting the contradictions broached by Hegel.

Thersites complex
In medicine, the term Thersites complex refers to patients who have a very minor deformity, yet who are extremely anxious about it. They frequently contact surgeons to correct their "highly perceived" deformity. The doctors tend to ignore the complaint and refer them to psychologists and psychiatrists. Psychotherapy, however is often refused, or ineffective.

Notes and references
Notes

References

Further reading 

 Apollodorus, The Library with an English Translation by Sir James George Frazer, F.B.A., F.R.S. in 2 Volumes, Cambridge, MA, Harvard University Press; London, William Heinemann Ltd. 1921. ISBN 0-674-99135-4. Online version at the Perseus Digital Library. Greek text available from the same website.
 Tzetzes, John, Book of Histories, Book VII-VIII translated by Vasiliki Dogani from the original Greek of T. Kiessling's edition of 1826. Online version at theio.com

External links
 

Achaeans (Homer)
People of the Trojan War
Aetolian characters in Greek mythology
Fictional jesters